|}

The Prix de Pomone is a Group 2 flat horse race in France open to thoroughbred fillies and mares aged three years or older. It is run at Deauville over a distance of 2,500 metres (about 1 mile and 4½ furlongs), and it is scheduled to take place each year in August.

History
The event is named after Pomona, the Roman goddess of fruit trees, gardens and orchards. It was established in 1920, and it was originally contested over 2,400 metres.

The race was cancelled in 1940, and it was held at Maisons-Laffitte from 1941 to 1943. It was cancelled again in 1944, and run once more at Maisons-Laffitte before returning to Deauville in 1946. It was extended to 2,600 metres in 1963.

The present system of race grading was introduced in 1971, and the Prix de Pomone was initially classed at Group 3 level. It was increased to 2,700 metres in 1973, and promoted to Group 2 status in 1983. It was cut to 2,500 metres in 2004.

Records
Most successful horse (2 wins):
 Zalataia – 1982, 1983
 Bright Moon – 1993, 1994

Leading jockey (6 wins):
 Freddy Head – Moquerie (1976, dead-heat), Gold River (1980), Zalataia (1982, 1983), Marie de Litz (1984), Light the Lights (1988)
 Thierry Jarnet – Bright Moon (1993, 1994), Helen of Spain (1996), Interlude (2000), Abitara (2001), Lune d'Or (2004)

Leading trainer (14 wins):
 André Fabre – Zalataia (1982, 1983), Galla Placidia (1985), Colorado Dancer (1989), Whitehaven (1990), Bright Moon (1993, 1994), Helen of Spain (1996), Bernimixa (2002), Diamond Tango (2005), Macleya (2007), La Pomme d'Amour (2012, 2013), Kitesurf (2018)

Leading owner (6 wins):
 Guy de Rothschild – Agace (1955), Louvette (1958), Marella (1960), Isoline (1965), Skelda (1971), Lady Berry (1973)

Winners since 1980

Earlier winners

 1920: La Brume
 1921: Marvel
 1922: Honeysuckle
 1923: Chantepie
 1924: Quoi
 1925: Javoton
 1926: Miquette
 1927: La Moldava
 1928: Bellecour
 1929: La Mie au Gue
 1930: Marylebone
 1931: Confidence
 1932: Campaspe
 1933: Queen of Scots
 1934: Sa Parade
 1935: Primrose
 1936: Birmania
 1937: Cousine
 1938: Queen
 1939: Xamalfi
 1940: no race
 1941: Pallas
 1942: Rengaine
 1943: Folle Nuit
 1944: no race
 1945: Joyeuse Lumiere
 1946: Fairlane
 1947: Platiname
 1948: Phydile
 1949: Miss Trolla
 1950: Blue Kiss
 1951: Arentelle
 1952: La Mirambule
 1953: Damaka
 1954: Caralina
 1955: Agace
 1956: Ad Altiora
 1957: La Malaguena
 1958: Louvette
 1959: Patrallora
 1960: Marella
 1961: Lezghinka
 1962: Psychose
 1963: Monade
 1964: Frisca
 1965: Isoline
 1966: Bergame
 1967: Modeste
 1968: Valya
 1969: Roseliere
 1970: Santa Tina
 1971: Skelda
 1972: Felicite
 1973: Lady Berry
 1974: Gazolina
 1975: Paddy's Princess
 1976: Moquerie / Sweet Rhapsody *
 1977: Proud Event
 1978: Fabuleux Jane
 1979: Bolsa

* The 1976 race was a dead-heat and has joint winners.

See also
 List of French flat horse races

References

 France Galop / Racing Post:

 france-galop.com – A Brief History: Prix de Pomone.
 galop.courses-france.com – Prix de Pomone – Palmarès depuis 1980.
 galopp-sieger.de – Prix de Pomone.
 horseracingintfed.com – International Federation of Horseracing Authorities – Prix de Pomone (2018).
 pedigreequery.com – Prix de Pomone – Deauville.

Long-distance horse races for fillies and mares
Deauville-La Touques Racecourse
Horse races in France
Recurring sporting events established in 1920
1920 establishments in France